The Carstairs index is an index of deprivation used in spatial epidemiology to identify Socio-economic confounding.

The index was developed by Vera Carstairs and Russell Morris, and published in 1991 as Deprivation and Health in Scotland. The work focusses on Scotland, and was an alternative to the Townsend Index of deprivation to avoid the use of households as denominators. The Carstairs index is based on four Census variables: low social class, lack of car ownership, overcrowding and male unemployment and the overall index reflects the material deprivation of an area, in relation to the rest of Scotland. Carstairs indices are calculated at the postcode sector level, with average population sizes of approximately 5,000 persons.

The Carstairs index makes use of data collected at the Census to calculate the relative deprivation of an area, therefore there have been four versions: 1981, 1991, 2001 and 2011. The Carstairs indices are routinely produced and published by the MRC/CSO Social and Public Health Sciences Unit at the University of Glasgow.

Calculating the Index 

The components of the Carstairs score are unweighted, and so to ensure that they all have equal influence over the final score, each variable is standardised to have a population-weighted mean of zero, and a variance of one, using the z-score method. The Carstairs index for each area is the sum of the standardised values of the components. Indices may be positive or negative, with negative scores indicating that the area has a lower level of deprivation, and positive scores suggesting the area has a relatively higher level of deprivation.

The indices are typically ordered from lowest to highest, and grouped into population quintiles. In the 1981, 1991 and 2001 indices, quintile 1 represented the least  deprived areas, and quintile 5 represented the most deprived. In 2011, the order was reversed, in line with the ordering of the Scottish Index of Multiple Deprivation.

Changes to the variables 

The low social class component of the 1981 and 1991 Carstairs index was created using the Registrar General's Social Class (later Social Class for Occupation). In 2001, this was superseded by the National Statistics Socio-economic Classification (NS-SEC). This meant that the definition of low social class had to be amended to reflect the approximate operational categories.
The definition of overcrowding was amended between 1981 and 1991, due to the inclusion of kitchens of at least 2 metres wide into the room count in the census.

References

Epidemiology
Social statistics data
1991 introductions